Hrastje is a settlement southwest of Maribor in northeastern Slovenia. It belongs to the City Municipality of Maribor.

Name
The name Hrastje is derived from the Slovene common noun hrast 'oak', referring to the local vegetation.

Church
On the slopes of the Pohorje range, at the highest point of the settlement's territory on a hill overlooking Maribor, lie the ruins of a local church dedicated to Saint Wolfgang. It was built at the end of the 15th century and was disused from 1785 onward. By 1869 it was already a ruin and began to be used as a mountain hut. A small chapel and the belfry have been restored.

References

External links

Hrastje on Geopedia

Populated places in the City Municipality of Maribor